Maia and Alex Shibutani refers to an American ice dance team:

 Maia Shibutani (born 1994)
 Alex Shibutani (born 1991)

Sibling duos